Lawrence Dennis Anderson (born December 3, 1952) is a former Major League Baseball pitcher. He played parts of three seasons for the Chicago White Sox and Milwaukee Brewers.

Career

Larry was selected by the Milwaukee Brewers in the 2nd round (27th overall) of the 1971 MLB June Amateur Draft out of El Rancho High School in Pico Rivera, CA.

External links

1952 births
Living people
Major League Baseball pitchers
Baseball players from California
Milwaukee Brewers players
Chicago White Sox players
Newark Co-Pilots players
Danville Warriors players
Shreveport Captains players
Sacramento Solons players
Thetford Mines Miners players
Spokane Indians players
Iowa Oaks players
Wichita Aeros players
Oklahoma City 89ers players
Charleston Charlies players
Richmond Braves players
Reading Phillies players
Evansville Triplets players
Charlotte O's players
People from Maywood, California